803 Naval Air Squadron was a Royal Navy Fleet Air Arm squadron.

History

Interwar
803 NAS was formed on 3 April 1933 by promoting No 409 (Fleet Fighter) Flight to the status of a squadron, with nine Ospreys.

803 Squadron was re-formed on 21 November 1938 at RNAS Worthy Down out of 'B' Flight of No 800 Squadron.

World War II

803 Squadron was re-formed (with Fairey Fulmar I) in October 1940, and after that served in the Eastern Mediterranean off , fighting at the Battle of Cape Matapan (shooting down two aircraft and damaging two more) and providing fighter cover for the Malta convoys and the evacuation of Crete. After HMS Formidable was damaged at Crete, 803 Squadron moved to Dekheila, where it was re-equipped with RAF Hurricanes.  Next it was based in Palestine for operations against Syria from June 1941, then in August 1941 was merged into the RN Fighter Squadron (a combined unit fighting in the Western Desert).

Re-equipped again with Fairey Fulmar II in March 1942, it next operated from Ceylon against the Japanese (such as against the Easter Sunday Raid), rejoining HMS Formidable in the Indian Ocean in April. 803 Squadron then saw operations in East Africa in 1943, before absorbing 806 Squadron for army co-operation exercises. The new combined squadron was disbanded at Tanga in August 1943, and only re-formed in June 1945 ready to join 19th Carrier Air Group in the Far Eastern theatre.  At the re-formation it was based at Arbroath and equipped with 25 Seafire L.IIIs, but just as it was about to ship out to the Far East in August 1945, the war came to an end.

Post-war 
When  was transferred to the Royal Canadian Navy (as HMCS Warrior) in January 1946, 803 Squadron went with the ship. In May 1951, she was renamed 870 Squadron RCN, and the designation "803 Squadron" again became available to the Royal Navy.

Re-formed in 1958, 803 NAS became the first FAA squadron to operate a nuclear-capable aircraft, when it received the Supermarine Scimitar F.1. (Eight years and five months later, she also became the last front-line FAA squadron to operate the Scimitar.) This was achieved when 803 Squadron subsumed 800 NAS (which was due to re-equip with the Blackburn Buccaneer S.1). 803 Squadron was again disbanded on 1 October 1966. The squadron's Scimitars were transferred to RNAS Brawdy, Pembrokeshire. There, they were overhauled, before flying to Airwork, at Hurn. Subsequently, many appeared went on static display in various parts of the UK.

803 NAS was re-formed as the headquarters for the Buccaneer S.2 trials, on 3 July 1967, based at RNAS Lossiemouth. In August 1968, the squadron demonstrated the FAA's ability to reinforce forward-deployed carriers, when a flight of four Buccaneers flew from Britain to in the Indian Ocean, joining Hermes. Following a government decision to scale-down the British carrier force, 803 NAS was disbanded on 18 December 1969; her aircraft were transferred to the RAF.

Second World War battle honours 
 North Sea 1939
 Norway 1940
 Libya 1940–41
 Matapan 1941
 Crete 1941
 Mediterranean 1941–44

Aircraft flown 
 Hawker Osprey 1932–1944
 Hawker Nimrod 1933–?
 Blackburn Skua II Dec 1938 – Oct 1940
 Blackburn Roc I April 1939 – April 1940
 Fairey Fulmar I Oct 1940 – June 1941
 Hawker Hurricane I June 1941 – March 1942
 Hawker Sea Hurricane June 1942 – Aug 1942
 Fairey Fulmar II March 1942 – Aug 1943
 Supermarine Seafire III June 1945-end of WW2
 Supermarine Seafire F.XV Aug 1945-end of WW2
 Supermarine Attacker FB.2 January 1953 - May 1954 
 Hawker Sea Hawk 1953–57
 Supermarine Scimitar 1958–1966
 Blackburn Buccaneer 1967–1969

Sources
 Fleet Air Arm 803 Squadron
 Squadron history
 FAA Buccaneer Association

External links 
 Pilot with 803 NAS

800 series Fleet Air Arm squadrons
Air squadrons of the Royal Navy in World War II
Military of British Ceylon
Military units and formations of Ceylon in World War II
Military units and formations established in 1932
Military units and formations disestablished in 1937
Military units and formations established in 1938
Military units and formations disestablished in 1969